Pachnephorus lopatini is a species of leaf beetle found in Senegal, described by Stefano Zoia in 2007. It is named after the entomologist Igor Lopatin.

References

Eumolpinae
Beetles of Africa
Insects of West Africa
Beetles described in 2007